Social design is the application of design methodologies in order to tackle complex human issues, placing the social issues as the priority. Historically social design has been mindful of the designer's role and responsibility in society, and of the use of design processes to bring about social change. Social design as a discipline has been practiced primarily in two different models, as either the application of the human-centered design methodology in the social sector or governmental sector, or sometimes is synonymously practiced by designers who venture into social entrepreneurship.

Models

Stanford model of design thinking 
Stanford University's Hasso Plattner Institute of Design (d school) and IDEO collaboratively created interdisciplinary research in 1991 in order to improve the design process, and from that, Stanford's model of design thinking as a process emerged. The Stanford model has been applied to social design, where the goal is to develop both human and social capital with new products and processes that can be profitable, a goal that the anti-capitalist magazine In These Times called "naïve, at best".

Margolin's social model 
Victor Margolin and Sylvia Margolin wrote in 2002 about the "social model" as a design practice and research methodology, primarily focused on social services but the ideas could be expanded in to educational systems, healthcare systems and for civic technology design. The social model involves a focus on human needs by taking inspiration from core social work literature and has an ecological perspective (that is less commonly seen in modes of design). Margolin suggests a multifaceted approach to solving problems, first accessing the situation by answering a few core questions, followed by survey research and interviews, content analysis of archival data, and/or participant observation.

IDEO model 
The design firm, IDEO defines social design as a process that encourages community facilitation including the sharing of conversation and ideas, beliefs and rituals. The process should be supportive and empowering for those involved and offer an innovative and feasible process. The designer(s) should not try to change people's behavior and they draws on the differences in cultural traditions and cultural beliefs in order to frame the problems within society. Additionally there is importance of the wider influence including the environmental awareness of the design, since the environment effects everyone and is interconnected.

History
Within the design world, social design is defined as a design process that contributes to improving human well-being and livelihood. 

The ideas behind social design has been inspired by Victor Papanek’s writings, he was one of the first to address issues of social design in the 1960s. He was focused on creating change within the design field and no longer tolerating misdesign, any design that does not account for the needs of all people and disregards its own environmental consequences. To be a positive force in society, design and designers need to be socially and morally responsible, designers carry a serious responsibility for the consequences their designs have on society. These consequences include environmental impact and designers can contribute to designing more considerate and ecological products by carefully selecting the materials they use. Papanek also remarks on designing for people's needs (rather than their wants) and designers have responsibility over the choices they make in design processes. Often design is detached from the real world and is focused on the commercial market by designing for luxury items or for just a few people based on aesthetics, or disposable items. Papanek emphasizes designers should have a keen eye for where the need is and often that is found by looking at marginalized populations.

Another author who contributes to the development of social design is Victor Margolin. He writes in the 2002 book, The Politics of the Artificial: Essays on Design and Design Studies the "designer's ability to envision and give form on material and immaterial products that can address human problems on broad scale and contribute to social well-being." This ideology is something that social design is built on. In this view social design is an activity that should not be framed with connotations of charity, aid donations, help, etc. It is not voluntary work, but it should be seen as professional contribution that plays a part in local economic development or livelihood. At the same time Social Design also challenges the conventional market model of designing. While traditionally, Design has been approached as a profession that remains strictly answerable to market forces, social design envisages the possibility of a more distributive conception of surpluses, by ensuring that the benefits of services and systems reach a wider range of user groups who may often fall outside the market system. Margolin writes, "The primary purpose of design for the market is creating products for sale. Conversely, the foremost intent of social design is the satisfaction of human needs."

Designer George Aye writes about the importance of acknowledging the role of power when designing for complex social sector issues, as one may do for social design projects. Depending on the project, designing for user engagement in a project can be more important than designing for solutions, and it encourages the use of human-centered design methodologies.

Engineer Chris Cox of Facebook used the term "social design" in 2010 and 2011 as, "[social design] defines the concept as improving how people build human-to-human, versus human-to-interface, connections online".  

Outside the design world social design appears in a number of professional environments, there are many artists that use the term social design or social practice to describe their work, though the work is exhibited within the contexts of the art world and have a different dialog when compared to design.

Initiatives
Hasso Plattner Institute of Design at Stanford University has supported social design programs.
The Archeworks school was founded in 1994 and is located in Chicago, they were early in teaching socially responsible design processes.
Curry Stone Design Prize was founded in 2008, a prize focused on design innovation in the social sector.
Measured Summit, Design+Health in New York City was founded in 2017, a social design conference centered around the health care industry.
The Center for Social Design at the Maryland Institute College of Art (MICA) was founded in 2011, and was one of the first graduate level degree programs in social design in the United States. They are dedicated to demonstrating the value of design in addressing complex social problems and to preparing the next generation of creative change-makers.
 The World Design Research Initiative, aka Worldesign, at the University of Art and Design Helsinki. Worldesign aims to explore issues relevant to social, welfare, and responsible design and to generate theory, as well as applicable systems or models. Its members produce exhibitions, workshops, and publications, which work as tools for testing and evaluating different social design applications.
 The University of Applied Arts Vienna has a master's degree dedicated to the challenges within urban social systems and related issues. The programme is oriented towards graduates from diverse fields of study using transdisciplinary teams. Art in synergy with project-related scientific methods and knowledge is seen as a tool for urban innovation.
 The University of Technology Sydney introduced a Bachelor of Creative Intelligence & Innovation degree in 2014, which must be completed in combination with another undergraduate degree. With a strong focus on developing novel solutions for social issues, it enables students "to participate in a future-facing, world-first, transdisciplinary degree that takes multiple perspectives from diverse fields, integrating a range of industry experiences, real-world projects and self-initiated proposals – equipping students to address the complex challenges and untapped opportunities of our times."
 The School of Design Ambedkar University, Delhi, India, offers an MDes in Social Design. The program commenced in 2013 and has been through many iterations. At its core the philosophy of the program is to make design more inclusive, at the level of creation and also at the level of users.
 In Spain, the Diseño Social EN+ works in integrating socially concerned designers and NGOs to help them improve the quality of their communications, whether from the formation or from the connection between designers and organizations. It launched in 2011.

See also 
Business ethics
Conceptual design
Public interest design – design practice towards the greater good
Service design – an ecological approach to designing a service.
Social change – about changing social norms, behaviors
Sociotechnical system – an approach to complex organizational work design that recognizes the interaction between people and technology in workplaces.
Social responsibility  – an ethical theory
Sustainable design – philosophy of designing physical objects, the built environment, and services to comply with the principles of ecological sustainability.
Universal design – he design of buildings, products or environments to make them accessible to all people, regardless of age, disability or other factors.

References

Further reading 

 
 
 

 
Stocker, Karl (2017). Sozio-Design/Socio-Design: Relevante Projekte – Entworfen für die Gesellschaft/Relevant Projects – Designed for Society. Birkhäuser (ed. with FH JOANNEUM).

External links 

 Video: What is Social Design? by IDEO (2015) and by Victoria University of Wellington, posted by Design For Change on YouTube
Podcast: An interview with John Emerson on design and social change (2013) from Internet Archive

Articles 

Bruinsma, M. (1999). "Idealism: An Ideal Design is Not Yet".
 Casey, V. (2007). "The Designer’s Dilemma." DesignersAccord.org.
 Emerson, J. (2009) "Mapping Power: Using design to get where we want to go"
 Emerson, J. (2008) "The Vision Thing: Seeing and creating change through design"
 Emerson, J. (2007) "The Conversation: When should designers make a political commitment?"
 Emerson, J. (2005) "Guns, Butter and Ballots: Citizens take charge by designing for better government"
 Emerson, J. (2004) "Taking it to the Streets: Graphic design for advocacy"
 Garland, K. (1964). "First Things First Manifesto."
 Hidalgo, M. (2014). "Armas de construcción Masiva: Manual de Diseño Social" Diseño Social EN+ (Spanish)
 Howard, A. (2001). "There is such a thing as society." EyeMagazine.com
 Howard, A. (2001). "Design Beyond Commodification." EyeMagazine.com
 Nini, P. (2004). "In Search of Ethics in Graphic Design." AIGA.org
 Poynor, R. (2007). "The Price of Juice." EyeMagazine.com
 Poynor, R. (2001). "The Time For Being Against." Typotheque.com
 Poynor, R. (2000). "First Things First 2000."
 Sagmeister, S. (2002). "How Good is Good?" Typotheque.com
 Various. (1883–2010). "100+ Years of Design Manifestos"
 Larosa, Antonio (2007). "Designers Against The iPodization Of Society"

Design